Puisseguin is a commune in the Gironde department in Nouvelle-Aquitaine in southwestern France. It is around 15 km east of Libourne.

In October 2015, 43 people died in a crash between a bus and a lorry.

Geography 
Located in the Pays du Libournais.

Bordering municipalities 
The neighboring towns are Lussac in the north, Tayac in the extreme north-east for about 250 meters, Saint-Cibard to the East, Saint-Philippe-d'Aiguille at the South-East, Saint-Genès-de-Castillon at the South and Montagne in the west.

Population

See also
Puisseguin-Saint-Émilion AOC
Communes of the Gironde department
Puisseguin road crash

References

Communes of Gironde